The 870s decade ran from January 1, 870, to December 31, 879.

Significant people
 Alfred the Great
 Al-Mu'tamid 
 Al-Muwaffaq
 Harald I of Norway
 Rhodri Mawr (the Great)
 Charles the Bald
 Rurik

References

Sources